Alan Flynn (28 September 1994) is an Irish hurler who plays for Tipperary Senior Championship club Kiladangan and at inter-county level with the Tipperary senior hurling team since 2017. He usually lines out as a left corner-back. Flynn is the brother of fellow Tipperary hurler Paul Flynn.

Honours
Tipperary
All-Ireland Senior Hurling Championship (1): 2019

Career statistics 
As of match played 19 May 2022:

Honours

References

1994 births
Living people
Kildangan hurlers (Tipperary)
Tipperary inter-county hurlers
Alumni of Mary Immaculate College, Limerick